Upper Bicutan (PSGC: 137 607 015) is one of twenty-eight barangays of Taguig City, Metro Manila in the Philippines.

History
In 1909, Bicutan is land surrounded by Pasig, Taguig, and Parañaque.  A large part of it was covered by Fort William McKinley. Powered by Proclamation No. 423 signed by Carlos P. Garcia on July 12, 1957, the land was initially allocated only for soldiers.

Due to the requests of citizens as well as by Pasig, Parañaque and Taguig governments that Bicutan not be included in the areas stated in the Proclamation 423, then-President Diosdado Macapagal signed Proclamation No. 246 that directed Bicutan to not be included in the operation of Proclamation No. 423. In the years 1964 and early 1965, the occupiers had their status as owners of their own land confirmed.

The formerly vacant area was soon filled with houses. Before the end of the year, the population of Bicutan has not dropped below 3,600 families.

Gradually the population rose until a lack of schools was recognized for this area, which was still remote from other urban areas. Therefore, on July 16, 1966, a collaborative effort led to the erection of a school.

The Sangguniang Barangay Upper Bicutan was under the management of Barangay Captain, Mr. Venancio T. Osano.  Upper Bicutan's Osano Park was named after this early leader.

Soon the community had a large water tank, an elementary school and a few paved roads, as well as the availability of electricity.

As a result, City Ordinances number 24-27, 57–61, 67–69, and 78, series of 2008 and the resulting plebiscite on December 28 of the same year, Purok 1, 2a, 3 and 4 were separated from the barangay and reconstituted as a new barangay, Central Bicutan. The barangay retained Purok 2b, 5 and 6.

References

Taguig
Barangays of Metro Manila